Christine Mukamutesi (born 24 December 1983) is a Rwandan middle-distance runner. She competed in the women's 800 metres at the 2000 Summer Olympics.

References

1983 births
Living people
Athletes (track and field) at the 2000 Summer Olympics
Rwandan female middle-distance runners
Olympic athletes of Rwanda
Place of birth missing (living people)